This is a partial list of governors of the Venezuelan Federal District. The constitutional reform of 1999 abolished the district government and created instead the Metropolitan District of Caracas, with jurisdiction over the territory of the District and also four adjacent municipalities (Baruta, Chacao, el Hatillo and Sucre) in Miranda.

List of Governors

See also

 List of Governors of States of Venezuela
 List of Venezuelans

References

External links
Capital City Politics in Latin America: Democratization and Empowerment - page 113

Federal District
Federal District Of Venezuela